Manoj Bhandage (born 5 October 1998) is an Indian cricketer. He made his Twenty20 debut for Karnataka in the 2018–19 Syed Mushtaq Ali Trophy on 21 February 2019.

Manoj Bhandage IPL 2023 
Manoj Bhandage is still a young and upcoming cricketer, he has not been picked up by any IPL franchise in the player auction or as a replacement player.

However, given his performances in domestic cricket and his potential, it is possible that he may attract the attention of IPL teams in the future. Manoj Bhandage will be playing IPl 2023 for Mumbai Indians. Manoj Bhandage bought it at the price of 20 lakh INR from Royal Challengers Bangalore (RCB) for IPL 2023.

Manoj Bhandage Net Worth 
Manoj Bhandage net worth as of 2023 is 10 cr Indian Rupees ($1.5 Million). Manoj Bhandage has earned his wealth through his cricket contracts, endorsements, and investments in various businesses. Overall, Manoj Bhandage’s net worth is a reflection of his success as a cricketer and his smart investments in various businesses.

With his continuing success in cricket and his growing business ventures, his net worth is expected to rise even further in the future.

References

External links
 

1998 births
Living people
Indian cricketers
Karnataka cricketers
Place of birth missing (living people)